The American School of Marrakesh (ASM) is a not-for-profit, independent school in Marrakech, Morocco. It offers classes from kindergarten through 12th grade.

History
The American School of Marrakesh was founded in 1995 by Joseph A. McPhillips III, Head of School at the American School of Tangier for thirty-five years. Starting as a branch of the American School of Tangier, which had been in existence since 1950, the American School of Marrakesh was intended by Mr. McPhillips to be a model institution, reflecting his personal belief in education and a belief in the Kingdom of Morocco.

Under the early leadership of Joe McPhillips and Mrs. Audrey Riffi, the school opened its doors in rented facilities in a villa with two teachers. It moved into its present purpose-built facility in stages. The Lower School opened on September 15, 2001, and the Upper School opened on March 27, 2002.  Adding grades each year, ASM graduated its first senior class in 2008.

Designed by Yoko Boccara and landscaped by Madison Cox, the present school facility is a tribute to the enduring nature of a school founded as a dream by Joe McPhillips and nurtured into successful pre-eminence in Marrakech by the combined efforts of teachers, parents, staff, administrators, board members, and friends of the school.

Curriculum

An independent private institution located on the outskirts of Marrakech, Morocco, ASM offers English-language, American-system education from kindergarten through 12th grade. The school follows AERO standards (American Education Reaches Out). ASM is fully accredited by the Middle States Association of Colleges and Schools.  Students must take four years of math, four years of English, four years of History, and four years of Science in order to graduate. Arabic is offered in Grades K-12 while French is introduced in Grade 2. Both languages are considered core curriculum classes that all students are required to take.  To accommodate students who join the school with little to no French or Arabic, the school offers several levels: Advanced, Standard, and Arabic/French for beginners.

References

External links
Official website

Educational institutions established in 1995
Buildings and structures in Marrakesh
International schools in Marrakesh
1995 establishments in Morocco
American international schools in Morocco
20th-century architecture in Morocco